Santa Cruz de la Sierra ("Holy Cross of the Mountain Range"), commonly known as Santa Cruz, is the largest city in Bolivia and the capital of the Santa Cruz department.

Situated on the Pirai River in the eastern Tropical Lowlands of Bolivia, the Santa Cruz de la Sierra Metropolitan Region is the most populous urban agglomeration in Bolivia with an estimated of 2.4 million population in 2020, it is formed by a conurbation of seven Santa Cruz municipalities: Santa Cruz de la Sierra, La Guardia, Warnes, Cotoca, El Torno, Porongo, and Montero.

For much of its history, Santa Cruz was mostly a small outpost town, and even after Bolivia gained its independence in 1825 there was little attention from the authorities or the population in general to settle the region. It was not until after the middle of the 20th century with profound agrarian and land reforms that the city began to grow at a very fast pace. Due to its low elevation at the foothills of the Andes and being situated in the Amazon basin, the city has a tropical climate unlike the other main metro area of La Paz that is thousands of metres higher in terms of elevation.

The city is Bolivia's most populous, produces nearly 35% of Bolivia's gross domestic product, and receives over 40% of all foreign direct investment in the country. This has helped make Santa Cruz the most important business center in Bolivia and the preferred destination of migrants from all over the country and from some neighboring countries as well.

History

Pre-Columbian era
Like much of the history of the people of the region, the history of the area before the arrival of European explorers is not well documented, mostly because of the somewhat nomadic nature and the absence of a written language in the culture of the local tribes. However, recent data suggests that the current location of the city of Santa Cruz was inhabited by an Arawak tribe that later came to be known by the Spanish as Chané. Remains of ceramics and weapons have been found in the area, leading researchers to believe they had established settlements in the area. Among the few known facts of these tribes, according to accounts of the first Spanish explorers that came into contact with the Chané, are that they had a formal leader, a cacique, called Grigota for several years but his reign came to an end after one of the several Guarani (Chirigano) incursions in the area.

Early European incursions and founding of the city

The first Europeans to set foot in the area were Spanish conquistadores from the recently created Governorate of New Andalusia that encompassed the territories of present-day Argentina, Uruguay, Paraguay, and Chile.

In 1549, Captain General Domingo Martinez de Irala became the first Spaniard to explore the region, but it was not until 1558 that Ñuflo de Chaves, who had arrived in Asuncion in 1541 with Álvar Núñez Cabeza de Vaca, led a new expedition with the objective of settling the region. After discovering that a new expedition from Asuncion was already underway, he quickly traveled to Lima and successfully persuaded the Viceroy to create a new province and grant him the title of governor on February 15, 1560. The settlement was named after Chaves's home town in Extremadura, where he grew up before venturing to America.

Shortly after the founding, attacks from local tribes became commonplace and Ñuflo de Chaves was killed in 1568 by Itatine natives. After Chaves's death, the conflicts with the local population as well as power struggles in the settlement forced the authorities in Peru to order the new governor, Lorenzo Suarez de Figueroa to relocate the city to the west. Many of the inhabitants, however, chose to stay behind and continued living in the original location. On September 13, 1590, the city was officially moved to the banks of the Guapay Empero river and renamed San Lorenzo de la Frontera. Nevertheless, the conditions proved to be even more severe at the new location forcing the settlers to relocate once again on May 21, 1595. Although this was the final relocation of the city, the name San Lorenzo continued to be used until the early 17th century, when the settlers who remained behind in Santa Cruz de la Sierra were convinced by the colonial authorities to move to San Lorenzo. After they moved the city was finally consolidated in 1622 and took its original name of Santa Cruz de la Sierra given by Ñuflo de Chaves over 60 years before. Remnants of the original settlement can be visited in Santa Cruz la Vieja ("Old Santa Cruz"), an archaeological site south of San José de Chiquitos.

Colonial Santa Cruz and revolutionary war

Over the next 200 years, several tribes were either incorporated under Spanish control or defeated by force. The city also became an important staging point for Jesuit missions to Chiquitos and Moxos, leading to the conversion of thousands of Guaranies, Moxeños, Chiquitanos, Guarayos and Chiriguanos that eventually became part of the racially mixed population of the modern Santa Cruz, Beni, Pando and Tarija departments of Bolivia. Another important role the small town played in the region for the Spanish Empire was to contain the incursions of Portuguese Bandeirantes, many of which were repelled by the use of force over the years.
The efforts for consolidating the borders of the Empire were not overlooked by the authorities in Lima, who granted the province a great degree of autonomy. The province was ruled by a Captain General based in Santa Cruz, and, in turn, the city government was administered by two mayors and a council of four people. Citizens of Santa Cruz were exempt from all imperial taxes and the mita system used in the rest of the Viceroyalty of Peru was not practiced. However, in spite of its strategic importance, the city did not grow much in colonial times. Most of the economic activity was centered in the mining centers of the west and the main source of income of the city was agriculture.

Animosity towards imperial authorities began at the turn of the 18th century when the new system of intendencias reached the new world. The seat of government was taken away from the city and moved to Cochabamba, and many of the powers delegated by the viceroyalty were now in the hands of appointees of the crown. Like in many parts of Spanish America at the time, angered by the reforms the criollos saw as a threat to their way of life, and taking advantage of the Peninsular War, the local population, led by Antonio Vicente Seonane, revolted on September 24, 1810, overthrowing the governor delegate. A junta of local commanders took control of the government in his place. The revolutionaries, as it was the case with most of the revolts in Spanish America, remained loyal to the King of Spain, while repudiating the colonial authorities until after the end of the Peninsular War.

By 1813 the city was once again under imperial control. At this time, by order of General Manuel Belgrano, the revolutionary armies of Argentina sent a small force led by Ignacio Warnes to "liberate" Santa Cruz. After his successful campaign, he assumed control of the government of the city. In a little over a year Warnes was able to gather tremendous support from the population, enlisting criollos, mestizos and natives to the revolutionary army, and allying with the revolutionary leader of Vallegrande, Alvarez de Arenales, to defeat a strong imperial force in the Battle of Florida. This victory proved to be a serious blow to Spanish forces in the region. Nevertheless, two years after the victory of Florida, imperial forces launched a new offensive in the province led by Francisco Javier Aguilera. This campaign ended with the defeat and death of Ignacio Warnes and his forces in the Battle of Pari. Triumphant, Aguilera marched into the city with orders to quell the insurrection and reinstate the Spanish governor. This proved to be a very difficult task, with several revolutionary leaders, such as Jose Manuel "Cañoto" Baca and Jose Manuel Mercado, rising up in the coming years from the city itself and elsewhere in the province. These new leaders fought colonial authorities for seven years until they finally deposed the last Spanish governor, Manuel Fernando Aramburu, in February 1825 after news of the defeat of the imperial armies in the west had reached the city.

Geography

The city is located in the eastern part of Bolivia (17°45', South, 63°14', West) at around 400 m above sea level. It is part of the province of Andrés Ibáñez and the capital of the department of Santa Cruz. The city of Santa Cruz is located not far from the easternmost extent of the Andes Mountains and they are visible from some parts of the city.

Climate
Santa Cruz is an example of the influence of continentality (reflecting the thermal amplitude) in the tropics, without the four well-defined seasons of the year but greater deviations of temperature than other places in the coast or island. Although the weather is generally very warm all year round, cold winds called "surazos" can blow in occasionally (particularly in the winter) from the Argentine pampas making the temperature drop considerably. The months of greatest rainfall are December and January.
Santa Cruz sits at the edge of the Codo de Arica, where winds are particularly strong in Bolivia. Annual variations in temperature and precipitation are common, as is the case across much of the region.

Demographics

The city of Santa Cruz is, besides the largest cities in Bolivia, the one with the greatest mestizo and Creole identity, and with a smaller indigenous population. The first settlers of Santa Cruz were mainly the Native Chane people of East Bolivia followed by the Spaniards that accompanied Ñuflo de Chávez, as well as Guarani natives from Paraguay, and other native American groups that previously lived there working for the Spanish crown. Eventually, the Spanish settlers and native people of Bolivia began to mix which has resulted in the majority of the city population being mestizo. When the Spanish settlers arrived to Bolivia, Catholicism, as well as the Spanish language, were implemented onto the natives which is now why the city is predominantly Catholic and speak Spanish. Nevertheless, native religions and languages are still used by a minority of the population.

There was a distinction between the ethno-demographic profile of the Santa Cruz de la Sierra region, marked by the mestizo, Spanish and eastern indigenous presence, in relation to the population of the Bolivian Altiplano, western part of the country mostly Andean indigenous with a smaller mestizo and Spanish presence.  However, in the last 60 years, large migrations from the western regions of Bolivia to Santa Cruz have transformed the demographics of the city and department redefining its social and ethnic spectrum.  In recent years, external migration has also become noticeable in Santa Cruz.  Immigrants in Bolivia, especially in Santa Cruz have mainly originated from Argentina, Brazil, Spain, Peru, United States and Mexico.

Economy

The city of Santa Cruz de la Sierra has utility infrastructure, roads and highways, and lively shopping and business. The main sectors that drive the economy are oil, forestry companies, agribusiness, and construction. Santa Cruz contributes more than 80% of national agricultural production, and also has contributed over 35% of GDP in recent years. 

Santa Cruz de la Sierra is served by Bolivia's largest airport, the Viru Viru International Airport, with service on 14 airlines, 10 of which are from other countries, and 12 of them being passenger ones and two being cargo-only airlines. The airline AeroSur had its headquarters in Santa Cruz. The airline ceased operations in May 2012 and has been replaced by Boliviana de Aviación, which flies from Santa Cruz to Miami, Madrid, São Paulo, Buenos Aires and Lima. 

It was formerly linked with the Brazilian railway system through a line to Corumbá, Brazil. This line, which was reputed to have a poor safety record, was abandoned after a highway to the Brazilian border was built in the 1980s.

Bolivia's largest shopping mall, the Ventura Mall is located in the city of Santa Cruz.

Twin towns and sister cities

Santa Cruz de la Sierra is twinned with:

  Edinburgh
  Campinas
  Curitiba
  Córdoba
  Paraná
  Rosario
  La Plata
  Salta
  Tucumán
  Montevideo
  Miami
  Santa Cruz
  Taichung
  Tainan City
  Santa Cruz de Tenerife
  Asunción
  Arequipa
  Arica
  Villahermosa
  Bucaramanga

References

Further reading

Gutsch, Jochen-Martin, "Im Labyrinth der Unordnung" [In the Labyrinth of Disorder]. Der Spiegel. 5 December 2005, pp. 144–50.

External links

 
 Official city government site
 

 
Populated places established in 1561
1561 establishments in the Spanish Empire
1561 establishments in South America